Thekpui is a village in the Champhai district of Mizoram, India. It is in the Khawbung R.D. Block.

Demographics 
At the time of the 2011 census of India, Thekpui had 62 households. The effective literacy rate (i.e. the literacy rate of population excluding children aged 6 and below) was 95.77%.

References 

Villages in Khawbung block